Elizabeth Loaiza Junca (born 1989) is a Colombian model, beauty pageant winner and helicopter pilot.

Elizabeth began modelling at the age of 4. She won the Miss Mundo Colombia (Miss World Colombia) beauty pageant in 2006.

Cover of countless magazines such as SoHo, which has been ported four times, Don Juan, Novias, Tv and Novelas, Vea, among others. In 2015 was an image of Colombian Clinic of Obesity and Metabolism, and protagonist of a music video of John Paul Ospina called Doin 'it.

References

External links
 

Living people
1989 births
Colombian beauty pageant winners
Colombian aviators
Colombian female models
Miss World 2006 delegates